Jelena Čanković (Serbian Cyrillic: Јелена Чанковић; born 13 August 1995) is a Serbian professional footballer who plays as a midfielder for Women's Super League club Chelsea FC and the Serbia women's national team. She previously played for FC Rosengård of the Swedish Damallsvenskan.

Club career 
Čanković joined FC Barcelona in August 2013 from Spartak Subotica. In September 2013, Čanković made her debut for the senior Serbia women's national football team. She played for Ferencvárosi TC before she signed for Växjö DFF. In 2016 Čanković was chosen as Player of the year in the Hungarian Jet-Sol Liga. In 2018 she provided the most assists in Damallsvenkan and was named one of three nominees for Best Midfielder, selected from Swedish national team players and Damallsvenskan players.

On 26 August 2022, Chelsea announced that they had sign Čanković on a three-year deal.

Personal life
The footballer Jovana Damnjanović is Čanković's first cousin.

Career statistics 
International goals

Honours
Spartak Subotica
Serbian Super Liga: 2010–11, 2011–12, 2012–13, 2014–15
Serbian Women's Cup: 2011–12, 2012–13
Barcelona
Primera División: 2013–14
Ferencváros
Női NB I: 2014–15, 2015–16
Hungarian Women's Cup: 2014–15, 2015–16, 2016–17
Växjö
Elitettan: 2017
FC Rosengård

 Damallsvenskan: 2019, 2021

Svenska Cupen: 2021–22
Individual

 Női NB I Player of the year: 2016

References

External links
 
 UEFA Statistic
 Jelena Čanković via Skype
 Jelena Čanković young girl, YouTube
 Jelena Čanković analiza la Champions contra el Brondby
 
 

1995 births
Living people
Women's association football midfielders
Serbian women's footballers
Serbia women's international footballers
Primera División (women) players
FC Barcelona Femení players
Ferencvárosi TC (women) footballers
Damallsvenskan players
Växjö DFF players
FC Rosengård players
Serbian expatriate women's footballers
Serbian expatriate sportspeople in Spain
Expatriate women's footballers in Spain
Serbian expatriate sportspeople in Hungary
Expatriate women's footballers in Hungary
Serbian expatriate sportspeople in Sweden
Expatriate women's footballers in Sweden
Expatriate sportspeople in England
ŽFK Spartak Subotica players